UJFM 95.4 is a Community Radio Station, based at the University of Johannesburg, Bunting Road Campus. Previously known as RAU Radio, the station obtained a four-year community broadcasting licence in February 2004 on the frequency 95.4fm broadcasting under a new name. Broadcasting over a 50 km radius from the campus, the station employs registered students as well as outside presenters. The station aims to allow all staff members to learn and operate within a commercial station environment. Many ex-UJFM staff members have gone on to achieve success on radio and on other various media platforms.

UJFM 95.4 has transformed its on-air programming style and content, from a previously "Rock" music genre, to a commercial feel that includes an eclectic mix of music and talk that is pertinent to a primary target audience between the ages of 16 years and 28 years; reflecting the demographics of the UJ community and serving as an "info-tainment" portal.  As the presence of UJFM firmly entrenches itself amongst the 4 campuses of UJ, the voice of UJFM strives to serve as a platform for healthy engagement amongst its community.

In April 2010, UJFM 95.4 moved into its new studios located at the Bunting Road Campus allowing for a professional radio broadcast environment.

Programming 
Programming on UJFM 95.4 has transformed over the past 2 years to include talk radio, specialized music programming as well as student issues directly pertaining to the community. The station prides itself in being a voice for the student by the student and strives to engage in topical issues that affect the UJ student. 
Incorporating the faculties across all 4 of the UJ campuses, UJFM 95.4 aims to get to the heart of matters within UJ and maintain the moral responsibility to the community it serves.

UJFM 95.4 is more than just an "infotainment portal", challenging listeners with the hard-hitting questions that plague our country, it invokes the need to discuss the issues within the social fabric of our country and upholds the moral responsibility to serve its community through effective progressive talk.

Presenters

Newsreaders 
Headlines are provided on the half-hour and the full news report on the hour.

Andani Seditsha
Elizabeth Ampofo 
Neo Nkosi
Linda Khumalo
Lindo Magasela
Heidi Giokos
Mummy Mohlahlo
Precious Maputle
Thobile Nkosi
Sibusiso Ngwenya
Steven Darge
Thando Dhaza
Luyanda Lebepe
Buhle Hlatshwayo
Delane N. Tsipa
Thuli Pooe
Veronica Makhaoli
Mbali Motsoeneng
Tshepang Masilo

Sports Presenter 
Mashel Mokale
Andile Ntuli
 Hope Thobejane

Management  
Anathi Sidali

Coverage areas and frequencies 
Greater Johannesburg (95.4 FM)

Broadcast languages
Predominantly English

Broadcast time
24/7

Target audience
Age Group 16 - 28 in LSM Groups 6 – 10

Programme format
65% Music (40% South African, 60% International)
35% Talk

Listenership figures

References

External links 

UJFM Official Website
SAARF Website
Sentech Website

UJFM
UJFM
UJFM